Ana María Oramas González-Moro (born 17 July 1959) is a Spanish politician affiliated to Canarian Coalition. She is member of the Congress of Deputies for Santa Cruz de Tenerife since 2007 and spokesperson for Canarian Coalition in the Mixed Group. She was also Mayor of San Cristóbal de La Laguna from 1999 to 2008.

References

1959 births
Living people
21st-century Spanish politicians
21st-century Spanish women politicians
Members of the 10th Congress of Deputies (Spain)
Members of the 11th Congress of Deputies (Spain)
Members of the 12th Congress of Deputies (Spain)
Members of the 13th Congress of Deputies (Spain)
Canarian Coalition politicians
Members of the 3rd Parliament of the Canary Islands
Members of the 4th Parliament of the Canary Islands
People from Santa Cruz de Tenerife